Virginia María del Carmen Reginato Bozzo (born 16 July 1939) is a Chilean politician. A member of the Independent Democratic Union (UDI) party, she formerly served as mayor of the city of Viña del Mar.

From 1992 to 2004 she served as councilor, and in 2004 was elected for the first time to lead the municipality for a four-year term. In the 2008 municipal elections, she was re-elected with the top national majority in votes (107,355) and the sixth largest percentage, with 78.76%. She is popularly known as "Tía Coty" (Aunt Coty).

Biography
Born on 16 July 1939 in Valparaíso, she lived in the  area until age three, when her parents moved to Viña del Mar.

While her official biography states that she studied at the Scuola Italiana and the College of the French Nuns of Valparaíso, her formal education is known to have reached the third grade, and in 2007 she passed her basic and secondary education through free exams at El Sembrador de Colina school. This validation of studies has been questioned for having been allegedly carried out in a day, and deputies filed a complaint against Reginato in 2013 for falsification of a public instrument, an accusation which was dismissed.

During her youth she was a beauty queen five times – at the centenary celebrations of the Sixth Fire Company of Valparaiso, the  carnival, the Società Canotieri Italiani, the Scuola Italiana kermesse, and the first International Industrial Fair.

She married Juan Gray, with whom she had two children, Verónica and Ricardo.

Political career

Roles during the military dictatorship and councilor
A sympathizer of the right, her political career began as a volunteer at the National Secretariat for Women in 1975, an institution where she later served as the communal secretary of Viña del Mar (1981) and provincial secretary of Valparaíso (1982). She joined the Community Development Council (CODECO) of the Municipality of Viña del Mar from 1983 to 1988. She later served as regional secretary of the National Secretariat for Women.

Mayor of Viña del Mar

In the  she defeated incumbent mayor Dr.  with 47.88% of the votes, becoming the first woman in the city to attain the position through the electoral process, and the second after Eugenia Garrido, a councilor appointed by the military regime.

Her administration put emphasis on the tourist image of Viña del Mar, the social development of the most vulnerable sectors of the municipality, as well as implementing an extensive citizen security program and bidding for organizing rights for the Viña del Mar International Song Festival.

In the municipal elections of 2008 she obtained 78.84% of the votes, being re-elected as mayor of Viña del Mar for the term 2008–2012, with the top national majority, and the most votes of any woman mayor in the country, with 107,355. In 2012 and  she was also re-elected to the position, for the terms 2012–2016 and 2016–2020, after which she will have served 16 years in the mayor's office of the so-called "garden city".

References

External links

 Mayor's Office of Viña del Mar

1939 births
Independent Democratic Union politicians
Living people
Mayors of places in Chile
People from Viña del Mar
People from Valparaíso
Women mayors of places in Chile
Mayors of Viña del Mar
Municipal councillors of Viña del Mar